Suwaphan Tanyuvardhana (born 23 December 1953 in Ratchaburi) is a Thai officer and politician. He is a former director of the National Intelligence Agency from 2009 until 2014.

Early life
Suwaphan was born on 23 December 1953 in Ratchaburi Province.

Suwaphan attended high school at Daruna Ratchaburi School and Triam Udom Suksa School and then study at Faculty of Law, Chiang Mai University.

Early career
Suwaphan took government service under the National Intelligence Agency previously served as Deputy Director and was the director of the National Intelligence Agency in 2009. He also served as a committee in the Emergency Situation Center during the government of Abhisit Vejjajiva and continued to work in the government, Yingluck Shinawatra and the government of General Prayut Chan-o-cha until his retirement on 30 September 2014.

Political career
In August 2014, he was appointed Minister to the Prime Minister's Office in the government of General Prayut Chan-o-cha. Later in December 2016, he was appointed Minister of Justice. Later in November 2017, he was appointed as Minister for the Office of the Prime Minister again after having held the position when he started the Cabinet.

Later on May 7, 2019, Suwapan submitted a resignation letter from the Prime Minister's Office to General Prayut Chan-o-cha, Prime Minister, to hold the position senator which will take effect the next day, which is on Wednesday 8 May 2019.

Royal decorations 
Suwaphan has received the following royal decorations in the Honours System of Thailand:
  Knight Grand Cordon (Special Class) of The Most Noble Order of the Crown of Thailand
  Knight Grand Cordon (Special Class) of the Most Exalted Order of the White Elephant

References

Suwaphan Tanyuvardhana
1953 births
Living people
Suwaphan Tanyuvardhana
Suwaphan Tanyuvardhana
Suwaphan Tanyuvardhana